Kuluin is a suburb of Maroochydore in the Sunshine Coast Region, Queensland, Australia.

History 
The locality takes its name from an Aboriginal word in the Kabi language meaning black swan.

Kuluin State School opened in 1987.

Education 
Kuluin State School is a government primary (Prep-6) school for boys and girls at Tallow Wood Drive. In 2017, the school had an enrolment of 622 students with 47 teachers (41 full-time equivalent) and 21 non-teaching staff (16 full-time equivalent).  In 2018, the school had an enrolment of 596 students with 46 teachers (38 full-time equivalent) and 20 non-teaching staff (15 full-time equivalent). The school includes a special education program.

There are no secondary schools in Kuluin. The nearest government secondary school is Maroochydore State High School in neighbouring Maroochydore to the east.

Amenities 
There are a number of parks in the area:

 Daintree Cl Park, Drain
 Daintree Park

 Kuluin Neighbourhood Park

 Kuskoff Park

 Martins Creek Bushland Conservation Reserve

 Martins Creek Soccer Ground

 Mcarthur Park

 South Eudlo Creek Bushland Conservation Reserve

 Tallow Wood Drive Environmental Park

References

External links

 

Suburbs of the Sunshine Coast Region
Maroochydore